The Chuck Tanner Baseball Manager of the Year Award is the original name for two awards that are given by the Rotary Club of Pittsburgh, in Pittsburgh, Pennsylvania. It is named for Chuck Tanner, former manager of the Pittsburgh Pirates, and was first awarded on November 17, 2007 at the city's Rivers Club. For the first three years, the award was given to a manager in Major League Baseball. In 2010, a second award was presented to the "Chuck Tanner Collegiate Baseball Manager of the Year"; the original award was renamed the "Chuck Tanner Major League Baseball Manager of the Year Award".

During the selection process, a major factor for the committee is each candidate's career achievement.

Proceeds from the annual awards dinner in November are used by the Club to support its humanitarian service initiatives and Rotary Foundation programs.

Winners

Chuck Tanner Major League Baseball Manager of the Year Award
See footnote

Chuck Tanner Collegiate Baseball Manager of the Year Award
2010 – Joe Jordano, University of Pittsburgh
2011 - Jim Chester, Penn State Greater Allegheny
2012 - Loren Torres, Point Park University

See also
Manager of the Year Award
The Sporting News Manager of the Year Award
MLB This Year in Baseball Awards Manager of the Year
Baseball America Manager of the Year
Baseball Prospectus Internet Baseball Awards Manager of the Year
Associated Press Manager of the Year (discontinued in 2001)
Honor Rolls of Baseball#Managers
Sporting News Manager of the Decade (2009)
Sports Illustrated MLB Manager of the Decade (2009)
MLB All-Time Manager (1997; BBWAA)
MLB all-time managerial wins
Baseball awards#U.S. major leagues: Awards by organizations other than MLB
List of MLB awards
List of college baseball awards#Coaching awards
Baseball awards#U.S. college baseball

References

Further reading

External links
Rotary Club of Pittsburgh official website (click on "Chuck Tanner Event")

Rotary International
Baseball coaching awards in the United States
Sports in Pittsburgh